Peter Edmondson (24 October 1941 – 26 June 1993) was an English cricketer. He was a left-handed batsman and right-arm medium-pace bowler who played for Oxfordshire. He was born in Brighouse, Yorkshire and died in Lanzarote.

Having made his debut for the team in the Minor Counties Championship in 1969, he made a single List A appearance, during the 1970 season, against Worcestershire.  From the middle order, he scored a duck.

External links
Peter Edmondson at Cricket Archive

1941 births
1993 deaths
English cricketers
Oxfordshire cricketers
People from Brighouse
Cricketers from Yorkshire